Endocrine oncology refers to a medical speciality dealing with hormone producing tumors, i.e. a combination of endocrinology and oncology.

Few centres are specializing in hormone producing tumors only, due to the relatively low incidence. Most centres have gastroenterologists, oncologist or endocrinologists who deal with other diseases as well. One exception is the Uppsala Centre of Excellence in Neuroendocrine Tumors at Uppsala University Hospital in Sweden, where doctors treat only endocrine tumors.


Endocrine tumors

There are many different kinds of endocrine tumors, some of which are listed below:
 Gastrointestinal
 ECLoma
 Midgut carcinoid
 Appendix carcinoid
 Hindgut carcinoid sometimes also referred to as Rectal carcinoid
 Pulmonary
 Typical bronchial carcinoid
 Atypical bronchial carcinoid
 Large cell neuroendocrine carcinoma
 Small cell lung cancer
 Endocrine pancreatic tumors
 Non-functioning endocrine pancreatic tumors
 Insulinoma
 Gastrinoma
 Glucagonoma
 VIPoma
 Adrenals
 Adrenocortical carcinoma
 Pheochromocytoma
 Endocrine tumor syndromes
 Multiple Endocrine Neoplasia I, MEN1
 Multiple Endocrine Neoplasia II, MEN2
 von Hippel Lindau syndrome

References

Endocrine neoplasia
Rare cancers
Oncology
Oncology